John Symes, OBE (11 January 1879 – 23 September 1944) was a member of the gold medal winning Great Britain Olympic cricket team at the 1900 Olympic Games.

Personal life 
Symes was born 11 January 1879 in Crediton, Devon. He was educated at Queen Elizabeth's School, Crediton and Blundell's School in Tiverton. He worked as a solicitor in Crediton and eventually took over his father's practice. He was also clerk to Creditor Urban District Council for more than forty years. He served in the First World War in the 6th Battalion Devonshire Regiment and was awarded the OBE in 1919 for his service. He died of a heart attack while out shooting on a local farm in Crediton on 23 September 1944, he was 65

Cricket career 
He was a keen cricketer and captained his local side, he also played for the Devon Dumplings. He represented the gold medal winning Great Britain cricket team at the 1900 Summer Olympics, the only time cricket has featured in the Olympics. In the only match against France, he scored 15 runs in Great Britain's first innings and just one run in the second.

References

External links

Olympic final scorecard
Profiles of the Great Britain Olympic team

English cricketers
English Olympic medallists
1879 births
1944 deaths
Olympic cricketers of Great Britain
Cricketers at the 1900 Summer Olympics
Olympic gold medallists for Great Britain
Officers of the Order of the British Empire
Medalists at the 1900 Summer Olympics
People from Crediton